Anomoeoneis is a genus of diatoms belonging to the family Anomoeoneidaceae.

Species:

Anomoeoneis atacamensis 
Anomoeoneis bicapitata 
Anomoeoneis bohemica

References

Cymbellales
Diatom genera